Black Orchids is a 1917 American silent drama film written and directed by Rex Ingram. The film was released as The Fatal Orchids in the United Kingdom. The feature stars Cleo Madison, Francis McDonald and Dick La Reno. Ingram later remade the film as Trifling Women (1922).

Black Orchids is considered a lost film.

Plot
The synopsis released by the studio as printed in Motography reads:

Cast
Cleo Madison as Marie de Severac/Zoraida
Francis McDonald as George Renoir/Ivan
Dick La Reno as Emile de Severac
Wedgwood Nowell as Marquis de Chantal
Howard Crampton as Baron de Maupin
John George as Ali Bara
William J. Dyer as Proprietor of l'Hirbour Blanc

Reviews and reception
A write-up about the film in the Exhibitor's Trade Review notes that the story-telling device served to sidestep the censors: "Indeed, were it not for this method of picturing the adventures of the man-enslaving Zoraida, one can hardly imagine the film being offered as screen entertainment, in this country at least." Edward Weitzel wrote in his review of the film in the Moving Picture World, that the drama "deals almost exclusively with open defiance of all moral law, but ... holds the spectator's undivided attention to the end". Weitzel also commented on Ingram's direction, saying: "While no points of the plot are glossed over or left in doubt, there is no undue stress put upon any of the incidents and the atmosphere which surrounds the entire story belongs to it by right of birth."

See also
List of lost films

References

External links

Black Orchids (1917) at New York Times Movies

1917 films
1917 drama films
Silent American drama films
American silent feature films
Films directed by Rex Ingram
American black-and-white films
Lost American films
Universal Pictures films
1917 lost films
Lost drama films
1910s American films